Vom Kriege is a book on war and military strategy by Prussian general Carl von Clausewitz (1780–1831), written mostly after the Napoleonic wars, between 1816 and 1830, and published posthumously by his wife Marie von Brühl in 1832. It is one of the most important treatises on political-military analysis and strategy ever written, and remains both controversial and influential on strategic thinking.

Vom Kriege has been translated into English several times as On War. On War is an unfinished work. Clausewitz had set about revising his accumulated manuscripts in 1827, but did not live to finish the task. His wife edited his collected works and published them between 1832 and 1835.

His ten-volume collected works contain most of his larger historical and theoretical writings, though not his shorter articles and papers or his extensive correspondence with important political, military, intellectual and cultural leaders in the Prussian state. On War is formed by the first three volumes and represents his theoretical explorations.

History 

Clausewitz was among those intrigued by the manner in which the leaders of the French Revolution, especially Napoleon, changed the conduct of war through their ability to motivate the populace and gain access to the full resources of the state, thus unleashing war on a greater scale than had previously been seen in Europe. Clausewitz believed that moral forces in battle had a significant influence on its outcome. Clausewitz was well educated and had strong interests in art, history, science, and education.  He was a professional soldier who spent a considerable part of his life fighting against Napoleon. In his lifetime, he had experienced both the French Revolutionary Army's (1792-1802) zeal and the conscripted armies employed by the French crown. The insights he gained from his political and military experiences, combined with a solid grasp of European history, provided the basis for his work.

A wealth of historical examples is used to illustrate its various ideas. Napoleon and Frederick the Great figure prominently for having made very efficient use of the terrain, movement and the forces at their disposal.

Clausewitz's theory

Definition of war 
Clausewitz argued that war theory cannot be a strict operational advice for generals. Instead, he wanted to highlight general principles that would result from the study of history and logical thinking. He contended that military campaigns could be planned only to a very small degree because incalculable influences or events, so-called friction, would quickly make any too-detailed planning in advance obsolete. Military leaders must be capable to make decisions under time pressure with incomplete information since in his opinion "three quarters of the things on which action is built in war" are concealed and distorted by the fog of war.

In his 1812 Bekenntnisschrift ("Notes of Confession"), he presents a more existential interpretation of war by envisioning war as the highest form of self-assertion by a people. That corresponded in every respect with the spirit of the time when the French Revolution and the conflicts that arose from it had caused the evolution of conscript armies and guerrillas. The people's armies supported the idea that war is an existential struggle.

During the following years, however, Clausewitz gradually abandoned this exalted view and concluded that the war served as a mere instrument:  "Thus, war is an act of violence in order to force our will upon the enemy."

Purpose, goal and means 
Clausewitz analyzed the conflicts of his time along the line of the categories Purpose, Goal and Means. He reasoned that the Purpose of war is one's will to be enforced, which is determined by politics. The Goal of the conflict is therefore to defeat the opponent in order to exact the Purpose. The Goal is pursued with the help of a strategy, that might be brought about by various Means such as by the defeat or the elimination of opposing armed forces or by non-military Means (such as propaganda, economic sanctions and political isolation). Thus, any resource of the human body and mind and all the moral and physical powers of a state might serve as Means to achieve the set goal.

One of Clausewitz's best-known quotes summarizes that idea: "War is the continuation of policy with other means."

That quote in itself allows for the interpretation that the military will take over from politics as soon as war has begun, as, for example, the German General Staff did during World War I. However, Clausewitz had postulated the primacy of politics and in this context elaborated: "[...], we claim that war is nothing more than a continuation of the political process by applying other means. By applying other means we simultaneously assert that the political process does not end with the conclusion of the war or is being transformed into something entirely different, but that it continues to exist and proceed in its essence, regardless of the means, it  might make use of."

According to Azar Gat, the "general message" of the book was that "the conduct of war could not be reduced to universal principles [and is] dominated by political decisions and moral forces." These basic conclusions are essential to Clausewitz's theory:
 War must never be seen as having any purpose in itself but should be seen as a political instrument: "War is not merely a political act, but a real political instrument, a continuation of the political process, an application by other means."
 The military objectives in war that support one's political objectives fall into two broad types: "war to achieve limited aims" and war to "disarm" the enemy: "to render [him] politically helpless or militarily impotent."
 All else being equal, the course of war will tend to favor the party with the stronger emotional and political motivations, especially the defender.

Some of the key ideas (not necessarily original to Clausewitz or even to his mentor, Gerhard von Scharnhorst) discussed in On War include (in no particular order of importance):
 the dialectical approach to military analysis
 the methods of "critical analysis"
 the uses and abuses of historical studies
 the nature of the balance-of-power mechanism
 the relationship between political objectives and military objectives in war
 the asymmetrical relationship between attack and defense
 the nature of "military genius"
 the "fascinating trinity" of war
 philosophical distinctions between "absolute or ideal war," and "real war"
 in "real war," the distinctive poles of a) limited war and b) war to "render the enemy helpless"
 "war" belongs fundamentally to the social realm, rather than the realms of art or science
 "strategy" belongs primarily to the realm of art
 "tactics" belongs primarily to the realm of science
 the essential unpredictability of war
 simplicity: Everything is very simple in war, but the simplest thing is difficult. These difficulties accumulate...The strength of any strategy lies in its simplicity.
 the "fog of war"
 "friction"
 strategic and operational "centres of gravity"
 the "culminating point of the offensive"
 the "culminating point of victory"

Clausewitz used a dialectical method to construct his argument, which led to frequent modern misinterpretation because he explores various often-opposed ideas before he came to conclusions.

Modern perceptions of war are based on the concepts that Clausewitz put forth in On War, but they have been diversely interpreted by various leaders (such as Moltke, Vladimir Lenin, Dwight Eisenhower, and Mao Zedong), thinkers, armies, and peoples. Modern military doctrine, organization, and norms are all still based on Napoleonic premises, but whether the premises are necessarily also "Clausewitzian" is debatable.

The "dualism" of Clausewitz's view of war (that wars can vary a great deal between the two "poles" that he proposed, based on the political objectives of the opposing sides and the context) seems to be simple enough, but few commentators have been willing to accept that crucial variability. They insist that Clausewitz "really" argued for one end of the scale or the other. On War has been seen by some prominent critics as an argument for "total war".

It has been blamed for the level of destruction involved in the First and the Second World Wars, but it seems rather that Clausewitz, who did not actually use the term "total war", had merely foreseen the inevitable development that started with the huge, patriotically motivated armies of the Napoleonic wars. They resulted (though the evolution of war has not yet ended) in the atomic bombing of Hiroshima and Nagasaki, with all the forces and capabilities of the state devoted to destroying forces and capabilities of the enemy state (thus "total war"). Conversely, Clausewitz  has also been seen as "The preeminent military and political strategist of limited war in modern times".

Clausewitz and his proponents have been severely criticized by other military theorists, like Antoine-Henri Jomini in the 19th century, B. H. Liddell Hart in the mid-20th century, and Martin van Creveld and John Keegan more recently. On War is a work rooted solely in the world of the nation state, states historian Martin van Creveld, who alleges that Clausewitz takes the state "almost for granted", as he rarely looks at anything before the Peace of Westphalia, and mediaeval warfare is effectively ignored in Clausewitz's theory. He alleges that Clausewitz does not address any form of intra/supra-state conflict, such as rebellion and revolution, because he could not theoretically account for warfare before the existence of the state.

Previous kinds of conflict were demoted to criminal activities without legitimacy and not worthy of the label "war". Van Creveld argues that "Clausewitzian war" requires the state to act in conjunction with the people and the army, the state becoming a massive engine built to exert military force against an identical opponent. He supports that statement by pointing to the conventional armies in existence throughout the 20th century. However, revolutionaries like Karl Marx and Friedrich Engels derived some inspiration from Clausewitzian ideas.

English translations 
 1873. Graham, J.J. translator. Republished 1908 with extensive commentary and notes by Victorian imperialist F.N. Maude.
 1943. O. J. Matthijs Jolles, translator (New York: Random House, 1943). This is viewed by some modern scholars as the most accurate existing English translation.
 1968. Edited with introduction by Anatol Rapoport. Viking Penguin. . This is badly dated (based on the 1873 Graham translation), severely abridged (leaving out, for instance, Book Six on defense—which Clausewitz considered to be the stronger form of warfare), and badly biased (because of its Vietnam War era and the editor's hostility to "neo-Clausewitzian" Henry Kissinger).
 1976/1984. Michael Howard and Peter Paret, editors and translators. Princeton University Press. .
 1989. Michael Howard and Peter Paret, editors and translators. Princeton University Press. .

See also

Concepts 
 List of military theorists
 Philosophy of war
 Realpolitik

Books 
 Achtung - Panzer! by Heinz Guderian
 Anabasis and Hellenica by Xenophon
 The Art of War by Niccolò Machiavelli
 Commentarii de Bello Gallico by Gaius Julius Caesar
 Epitoma rei militaris by Publius Flavius Vegetius Renatus
 Infanterie Greift An by Erwin Rommel
 Storm of Steel by Ernst Jünger
 Strategikon of Maurice by Byzantine Emperor Maurice
 Tactica of Emperor Leo VI the Wise
 Truppenführung by Helmuth von Moltke the Elder
 The Utility of Force by General Sir Rupert Smith
 The Influence of Sea Power upon History by Admiral Alfred Thayer Mahan

Notes 
 a. : For example, writing in his introduction to Sun Tzu's Art of War, B. H. Liddell Hart stated that "Civilization might have been spared much of the damage suffered in the world wars of this century if the influence of Clausewitz's monumental tome On War, which molded European military thought in the era preceding the First World War, had been blended with and balanced by a knowledge of Sun Tzu's exposition on The Art of War."  This comment is tempered by the comment that the "ill-effects of Clausewitz's teaching arose largely from his disciples' too shallow and too extreme interpretation of it," but it remains an influential criticism.  Extracted from The Art of War (UNESCO Collection of Representative Works), Samuel B. Griffith https://web.archive.org/web/20060628174003/http://www.kw.igs.net/~tacit/artofwar/suntzu.htm.

References

Bibliography 
 Bassford, Christopher, 1994. Clausewitz in English: The Reception of Clausewitz in Britain and America. Oxford University Press.
 Bernard Brodie, 1976. A guide to the reading of "On War." Princeton University Press.

Further reading
 Bassford, Christopher, 2002. "Clausewitz and His Works." Describes the author's intent, and discusses interpretations and common misunderstandings.
 Coker, Christopher. Rebooting Clausewitz: 'On War' in the Twenty-first Century (Oxford University Press, 2017) online review.
 Cormier, Youri. War as paradox: Clausewitz and Hegel on fighting doctrines and ethics (McGill-Queen's Press-MQUP, 2016).
 Daase, Christopher, and James W. Davis (eds). Clausewitz on Small War  (2015) online review
 Erfourth M. & Bazin, A. (2014).   Clausewitz’s Military Genius and the #Human Dimension.  The Bridge.
 Hughes, R. Gerald. "Clausewitz, still the Master of War?: On Strategy in the Twenty-first Century." War in History 26.2 (2019): 287-296 [ online].
 Kornberger, Martin, and Anders Engberg-Pedersen. "Reading Clausewitz, reimagining the practice of strategy." Strategic Organization (2019): online
 LeMay, G.H.L. "Napoleonic Warfare" History Today (Aug 1951), Vol. 1 Issue 8, pp 24-32.
 Simpson, Emile. "Clausewitz's Theory of War and Victory in Contemporary Conflict." Parameters 47.4 (2017): 7-18.
 Stoker, Donald J. Clausewitz: His Life and Work (Oxford UP, 2014) 376 pp.  online review; also  excerpt

External links
 Online version of Vom Kriege - the 1832 German original
 Online version of On War - the 1873 English translation
 "On War" by Carl von Clausewitz. Project Gutenberg E-book. (2006, 2019). English translation of 1874 by Colonel J.J. Graham. Originally published in 1874 and 1909.

External links 

 Mind Map of On War
 The Clausewitz Homepage
 Clausewitz Gesellschaft (Clausewitz Association)

1832 non-fiction books
Books published posthumously
Military strategy books
Unfinished books
German-language books
Works about the theory of history
Works about warfare